The 2015 Sydney to Hobart Yacht Race, sponsored by Rolex and hosted by the Cruising Yacht Club of Australia in Sydney, New South Wales, was the 71st annual running of the "blue water classic." The 2015 edition began on Sydney Harbour at 1pm on Boxing Day (26 December 2015), before heading south for  through the Tasman Sea, past Bass Strait, into Storm Bay and up the River Derwent, to cross the finish line in Hobart, Tasmania. There were 108 starters; 77 finished.

Line honours were claimed by Comanche in a time of 2 days, 8 hours, 58 minutes and 30 seconds. The crew of Balance (Paul Clitheroe) were awarded the Tattersall's Cup.

Results

Line honours (first 10)

Handicap results (Top 10)

References

Sydney to Hobart Yacht Race
Sydney
Sydney
Tour